Sonic Youth was an American rock band based in New York City, formed in 1981. Founding members Thurston Moore (guitar, vocals), Kim Gordon (bass, vocals, guitar) and Lee Ranaldo (guitar, vocals) remained together for the entire history of the band, while Steve Shelley (drums) followed a series of short-term drummers in 1985, rounding out the core line-up. Jim O'Rourke (bass, keyboards, guitar) was also a member of the band from 1999 to 2005, and Mark Ibold (bass, guitar) was a member from 2006 to 2011.

Sonic Youth emerged from the experimental no wave art and music scene in New York before evolving into a more conventional rock band and becoming a prominent member of the American noise rock scene. Sonic Youth have been praised for having "redefined what rock guitar could do" using a wide variety of unorthodox guitar tunings while preparing guitars with objects like drum sticks and screwdrivers to alter the instruments' timbre. The band was a pivotal influence on the alternative and indie rock movements.

After gaining a large underground following and critical praise through releases with SST Records in the late 1980s, the band experienced mainstream success throughout the 1990s and 2000s after signing to major label DGC in 1990 and headlining the 1995 Lollapalooza festival. The band disbanded in 2011 following the separation and subsequent divorce of Gordon and Moore with their final live shows taking place in Brazil. The members have since asserted that the band is finished and would not reunite.

History

Formation and early history: 1977–1981 

Shortly after guitarist Thurston Moore moved to New York City in early 1977, he formed the group Room Tone with his roommates; they later changed their name to the Coachmen. After the breakup of the Coachmen, Moore began jamming with Stanton Miranda, whose band, CKM, featured Kim Gordon. Moore and Gordon formed a band, appearing under names like Male Bonding, Red Milk, and the Arcadians before settling on Sonic Youth in mid-1981. The name came from combining the nickname of MC5's Fred "Sonic" Smith with reggae artist Big Youth. Gordon later recalled that "as soon as Thurston came up with the name Sonic Youth, a certain sound that was more of what we wanted to do came about." The band played Noise Fest in June 1981 at New York's White Columns gallery, where Lee Ranaldo was playing as a member of Glenn Branca's electric guitar ensemble. Their performance impressed Moore, who described them as "the most ferocious guitar band that I had ever seen in my life", and he invited Ranaldo to join Sonic Youth. The new trio played three songs at the festival later in the week without a drummer. Each band member took turns playing the drums, until they met drummer Richard Edson.

Early releases: 1982–1985 

Branca signed Sonic Youth as the first act on his record label Neutral Records. In December 1981 the group recorded five songs at New York's Radio City Music Hall. The material was released as the EP Sonic Youth which, while largely ignored, was sent to a few key members of the American music press, who gave it uniformly favorable reviews. The album featured a relatively conventional post-punk style, in contrast to their later releases. Edson then quit the group for an acting career and was replaced by Bob Bert.

During their early days as part of the New York music scene, Sonic Youth formed a friendship with fellow New York noise rock band Swans. The bands shared a rehearsal space, and Sonic Youth embarked on its first tour in November 1982 supporting Swans. During a second tour with Swans the following month, tensions ran high and Moore constantly criticized Bert's drumming, which he felt was not "in the pocket". Bert was fired afterwards and replaced by Jim Sclavunos, who played drums on the band's first studio album, 1983's Confusion Is Sex, which featured a louder and more dissonant sound than their debut EP. Sonic Youth set up a tour of Europe for the summer of 1983. Sclavunos, however, quit the band after only a few months. The group asked Bert to rejoin, and he agreed on the condition that he would not be fired again after the tour's conclusion. Bert went on to play on the band's Kill Yr Idols EP later in 1983.

Sonic Youth were well received in Europe, but the New York press largely ignored the local noise rock scene. Eventually, as the press began to take notice of the genre, Sonic Youth was grouped with bands like Big Black, the Butthole Surfers, and Pussy Galore under the "pigfucker" label by Village Voice editor Robert Christgau. Another critic from The Village Voice panned a substandard September concert in New York. Gordon wrote a scornful letter to the newspaper, criticizing it for not supporting its local music scene, to which Christgau responded that the paper was not obligated to support them. Moore retaliated by renaming the song "Kill Yr Idols" to "I Killed Christgau with My Big Fucking Dick", before the two eventually sorted out their differences amicably.

During another tour of Europe in 1984, Sonic Youth's disastrous London debut (where the band's equipment malfunctioned and Moore destroyed it onstage in frustration) actually resulted in rave reviews in Sounds and the NME. When they returned to New York they were so popular that they were able to book local gigs regularly. That same year, Moore and Gordon were married, and Sonic Youth released Bad Moon Rising, a self-described "Americana" album that served as a reaction to the state of the nation at the time. The album, recorded by Martin Bisi, was built around transitional pieces that Moore and Ranaldo had come up with in order to take up time onstage during tuning breaks; as a result, there are almost no gaps between the songs on the records. Bad Moon Rising featured an appearance by Lydia Lunch in "Death Valley '69", which was inspired by the Charles Manson Family murders.

Due to a falling-out with Branca over disputed royalty payments from their Neutral releases, Sonic Youth signed with Homestead Records in the US and Blast First in the UK (which founder Paul Smith created simply so he could distribute the band's records in Europe). While the New York press ignored Bad Moon Rising upon its release, now viewing the band as too arty and pretentious, Sonic Youth gained critical acclaim in the United Kingdom, where the new album sold 5,000 copies.

Claiming he was bored with playing Bad Moon Rising live in its entirety for over a year, Bert quit the group and was replaced by Steve Shelley, formerly of the punk group The Crucifucks. Sonic Youth was so impressed with Shelley's drumming after seeing him play live that they hired him without an audition. Bert and Shelley both appeared in the music video for "Death Valley '69", as Bert had performed the drums on the song, but Shelley was the group's drummer when the video was filmed.

SST and Enigma: 1986–1989 

Sonic Youth had long appreciated SST Records; Ranaldo said, "It was the first record company we were on that we really would have given anything to be on." Sonic Youth signed with the label in early 1986 and began recording EVOL with Martin Bisi. The band gained national attention when signing with SST, making them the first band from the New York underground to gain such notice. The mainstream music press subsequently began to take notice of the band. Robert Palmer of The New York Times declared that Sonic Youth was "making the most startlingly original guitar-based music since Jimi Hendrix" and even People reviewed EVOL, describing the album as the "aural equivalent of a toxic waste dump." The album was later called "a classic" by Neil Young.

Around the same time, the band collaborated with Mike Watt under the alias Ciccone Youth, which was a play on the names Sonic Youth and Ciccone, the surname of pop singer Madonna. Sonic Youth released one single in 1986 and one studio album in 1988 under the Ciccone Youth name. The 1986 single, "Into the Groove(y)", was a cover of Madonna's "Into the Groove" and was preceded by "Tuff Titty Rap". The flip side of the record was Watt's cover of Madonna's "Burning Up" which had the altered title of "Burnin' Up". The Whitey Album included both Sonic Youth songs from the single plus a demo version of "Burnin' Up". The album also contained a cover of Robert Palmer's "Addicted to Love" which was recorded in a karaoke booth.

The 1987 Sonic Youth album Sister was a loose concept album partly inspired by the life and works of science fiction writer Philip K. Dick. The "sister" of the title was Dick's fraternal twin, who died shortly after her birth and whose memory haunted Dick his entire life. Sister sold 60,000 copies and received very positive reviews, becoming the first Sonic Youth album to crack the Top 20 of the Village Voice's Pazz & Jop critics poll.

Despite their critical success, the band became dissatisfied with SST due to concerns about payments and other administrative practices. Sonic Youth decided to release their next record on Enigma Records, which was distributed by Capitol Records and partly owned by EMI. The 1988 double LP Daydream Nation was a critical success that earned Sonic Youth substantial acclaim. The album came in second on the Village Voice Pazz & Jop poll and topped the year-end album lists at NME, CMJ, and Melody Maker. In 2005, it was one of 50 recordings chosen by the Library of Congress to be added to the National Recording Registry. The lead single from the album, "Teen Age Riot", was their first song to receive significant airplay on modern rock and college rock stations, reaching number 20 on the Billboard Modern Rock Tracks chart. A number of prominent music periodicals including Rolling Stone hailed Daydream Nation as one of the best albums of the decade and named Sonic Youth as the "Hot Band" in its "Hot" issue. Unfortunately, distribution problems arose and Daydream Nation was often difficult to find in stores. Moore considered Enigma a "cheap-jack Mafioso outfit" and the band began looking for a major label deal.

Major label career and becoming alternative icons: 1990–1999 

In 1990, Sonic Youth released Goo, their first album for Geffen. The album featured the single "Kool Thing" on which Public Enemy's Chuck D made a guest appearance. The record was considered much more accessible than their previous works and became the band's best-selling record to date.

In 1992, the band released Dirty on the DGC label. Their influence as tastemakers continued with their discovery of acclaimed skateboard video director Spike Jonze, who they recruited for the video for "100%", which also featured skateboarder turned actor Jason Lee. That song and "JC" discuss the murder of Joe Cole, a friend who worked with Black Flag as a roadie. The album features artwork by Los Angeles-based artist Mike Kelley. Dirty features a guest appearance by Ian MacKaye on the track "Youth Against Fascism". In 1993, the band contributed the track "Burning Spear" to the AIDS benefit album No Alternative, produced by the Red Hot Organization.

In 1994, the band released Experimental Jet Set, Trash and No Star, their best-charting release in the United States to date at No. 34 on the Billboard 200. Moore and Gordon's daughter, Coco Hayley Moore, was born later that year, and many of the songs from the album were never played live because there was never a full tour to support the album due to Gordon's pregnancy. In 1994, the band released a cover of The Carpenters' 1971 hit "Superstar" for the tribute album If I Were a Carpenter. The band headlined the 1995 Lollapalooza festival with Hole and Pavement. By that time, alternative rock had gained considerable mainstream attention, and the festival was parodied in The Simpsons episode "Homerpalooza" in 1996, which featured voiceovers from the band. They also performed the final credits theme for that episode.

The album Washing Machine was released in 1995 and represented a shift in Sonic Youth's sound, away from their punk rock roots and toward experimental and longer jam-based arrangements. Starting in 1997 they released a series of improvisational albums grouped under the title SYR with song titles and liner notes in various languages. SYR3: Invito al ĉielo, released in 1998, featured Jim O'Rourke who later became an official band member. Various songs from the SYR series were added to Sonic Youth's live performances, and others inspired tracks on the next proper Sonic Youth album, A Thousand Leaves, released in 1998.

Later DGC period: 2000–2006 
On July 4, 1999, Sonic Youth's instruments and stage equipment were stolen during a tour in Orange County, California. Almost 30 guitars and basses were stolen; some were recovered over the next 13 years. Forced to start from scratch with new instruments, they released the album NYC Ghosts & Flowers in 2000 and opened for Pearl Jam during the east coast leg of that band's 2000 tour.

In 2001, Sonic Youth collaborated with French avant-garde singer and poet Brigitte Fontaine on her album Kékéland. The following year, Sonic Youth participated in the first outing of the All Tomorrow's Parties music festival and curating the ensuing compilation album. The album Murray Street was released in 2002 and saw the addition of Jim O'Rourke as a full-time member on guitar, bass, and keyboards. During this period the band participated in the production of the documentary film Kill Your Idols, directed and produced by Scott Crary and covering the history of punk rock in New York City. The film was released in 2004.

In 2003 Sonic Youth released a split 7-inch single with Erase Errata. The next Sonic Youth album, Sonic Nurse, was also released in 2004. The band was slated to perform in the 2004 Lollapalooza tour along with acts such as the Pixies and the Flaming Lips, but the tour was canceled due to lackluster ticket sales. O'Rourke departed in 2006 and was replaced by ex-Pavement member Mark Ibold for touring purposes.

Rather Ripped was released in 2006 and was noted as a return to the band's earlier sound, due both to the departure of O'Rourke and the recovery of some of the instruments that had been stolen in 1999. Sonic Youth played the Bonnaroo Festival later that year. In December 2006 they released The Destroyed Room: B-Sides and Rarities. The compilation featured tracks previously available only on vinyl, tracks from limited-release compilations, B-sides to international singles, and some material that had never before been released. This marked the band's final Geffen release.

Matador period: 2007–2011 

In 2007, the band became one of the earliest big-name rock bands to play in China when they were brought in for a tour by the music company Split Works. In 2008 they released a compilation album on Starbucks Music, called Hits Are for Squares, with the tracks selected by other celebrities. Later in 2008, Sonic Youth ended their relationship with Geffen, due to dissatisfaction with how the label had promoted their last several albums. They then signed with independent label Matador Records, which released the album The Eternal in 2009. During this period they collaborated with John Paul Jones on the soundtrack for a performance at Merce Cunningham Dance Company to honor the company's founder. In 2010 the band scored and composed the soundtrack of the French thriller-drama Simon Werner a Disparu, which premiered at the Cannes International Film Festival. The soundtrack was released in 2011 as SYR9: Simon Werner a Disparu, an entry in experimental SYR series.

Disbandment: 2011-2013

On October 14, 2011, Kim Gordon and Thurston Moore announced that they had separated after 27 years of marriage. Sonic Youth's label Matador explained that plans for the band remained "uncertain", despite previously hinting that they would record new material later in the year. Sonic Youth performed their final concert on November 14, 2011, at the SWU Music & Arts Festival in Itu, São Paulo, Brazil. The following week, Lee Ranaldo stated in an interview that Sonic Youth would be "ending for a while".

Post-disbandment activities: 2013-present
In November 2013, Ranaldo said in response to the question of a possible reunion, "I fear not. Everybody is busy with their own projects, besides that Thurston and Kim aren't getting along together very well since their split… Let [the band] rest in peace." Thurston Moore updated and clarified the matter in May 2014: "Sonic Youth is on hiatus. The band is a democracy of sorts, and as long as Kim and I are working out our situation, the band can't really function reasonably." In her 2015 autobiography Girl in a Band, Gordon refers several times to the band having "split up" for good.

In 2020 during the COVID-19 pandemic, Sonic Youth sold official face masks based on the artwork from the album Sonic Nurse, with proceeds going to charities Brooklyn Community Bail Fund, Bed Stuy Strong, and Alexandria Ocasio-Cortez's COVID-19 Relief Fund. The same year, an extensive archive of live recordings from throughout the band's history was released on Bandcamp.

In January 2022, a new single "In & Out" was released ahead of the March release of the rarities album In/Out/In.

Musical style and influences 
Sonic Youth is considered a pioneering band in the noise rock and alternative rock genres. Their music has also been labelled experimental rock, indie rock, and post-punk.

Alternative tunings 
Sonic Youth's sound relied heavily on the use of alternative tunings. Scordatura on stringed instruments has been used for centuries and alternative guitar tunings had been used for decades in blues music, and to a limited degree in rock music (such as with Lou Reed's Ostrich guitar on The Velvet Underground & Nico). Michael Azerrad writes that early in their career,

[Sonic Youth] could only afford cheap guitars, and cheap guitars sounded like cheap guitars. But with weird tunings or something jammed under a particular fret, those humble instruments could sound rather amazing – bang a drum stick on a cheap Japanese Stratocaster copy in the right tuning, crank the amplifier to within an inch of its life and it will sound like church bells.

The tunings were painstakingly developed by Moore and Ranaldo during the band's rehearsals; Moore once reported that the odd tunings were an attempt to introduce new sounds: "When you're playing in standard tuning all the time [...] things sound pretty standard." Rather than re-tune for every song, Sonic Youth generally used a particular guitar for one or two songs, and would take dozens of instruments on tour. This would be the source of much trouble for the band, as live performances of many songs relied on specific guitars that have been uniquely prepared or otherwise altered for those exact songs.

Influences 
Moore said that Sonic Youth was heavily influenced by the Velvet Underground, along with The Stooges, Glenn Branca, Patti Smith, Wire, Public Image Ltd and French avant-gardist Brigitte Fontaine. They were also influenced by 1980s hardcore punk; after seeing Minor Threat perform in May 1982, Moore declared them "the greatest live band I have ever seen". He also saw The Faith performing in 1981 and had a strong admiration towards their only two records, a split LP with fellow Washington, D.C. hardcore band Void and the EP Subject to Change. While recognizing that their own music was very different from hardcore, Moore and Gordon, especially, were impressed by hardcore's speed and intensity, and by the nationwide network of musicians and fans. "It was great", said Moore, "the whole thing with slam dancing and stage diving, that was far more exciting than pogoing and spitting. [...] I thought hardcore was very musical and very radical."

Thurston Moore and Lee Ranaldo expressed on numerous occasions their admiration for the music of Joni Mitchell, such as this quote by Thurston Moore: "Joni Mitchell! I've used elements of her songwriting and guitar playing, and no one would ever know about it." Additionally, as with Sonic Youth, Joni Mitchell has always used a number of alternative tunings. The band named a song after her, "Hey Joni". Members of the band have also maintained relationships with other avant-garde artists from other genres and even other media, drawing influence from the work of John Cage and Henry Cowell.

Members

Final lineup
 Kim Gordon – vocals, bass, guitar (1981–2011)
 Thurston Moore – vocals, guitar (1981–2011)
 Lee Ranaldo – guitar, vocals (1981–2011)
 Steve Shelley – drums (1985–2011)
 Mark Ibold – bass, guitar (2006–2011)

Former members
 Anne DeMarinis – keyboards (1981)
 Richard Edson – drums (1981–1982)
 Bob Bert – drums (1982, 1983–1985)
 Jim Sclavunos – drums (1982–1983)
 Jim O'Rourke – bass, guitar, synthesizer (1999–2005)

Timeline

Discography

Studio albums
 Confusion Is Sex (1983)
 Bad Moon Rising (1985)
 EVOL (1986)
 Sister (1987)
 Daydream Nation (1988)
 The Whitey Album (1989, as Ciccone Youth)
 Goo (1990)
 Dirty (1992)
 Experimental Jet Set, Trash and No Star (1994)
 Washing Machine (1995)
 A Thousand Leaves (1998)
 NYC Ghosts & Flowers (2000)
 Murray Street (2002)
 Sonic Nurse (2004)
 Rather Ripped (2006)
 The Eternal (2009)

References

Bibliography

External links 

 
 
 
 

 
Musical groups established in 1981
Alternative rock groups from New York (state)
American experimental rock groups
American noise rock music groups
American indie rock groups
American post-punk music groups
Musical quartets
Homestead Records artists
Blast First artists
SST Records artists
DGC Records artists
Geffen Records artists
Matador Records artists
Ecstatic Peace! artists
Sub Pop artists
Enigma Records artists
Interscope Records artists
No wave groups
World Music Awards winners
Musical groups from New York City
1981 establishments in New York City
Musical groups disestablished in 2011
Sub Rosa Records artists
Au Go Go Records artists